Unterarzt (short: UArzt or UA) was a military rank in the German Reichswehr and Wehrmacht until 1945.

It describes a qualified or licensed surgeon or dentist of the armed forces with the last or highest Officer Aspirant (O.A. or OA – de: Offizieranwärter) rank. According to the rank hierarchy it was comparable to Sergeant First Class (de: Oberfeldwebel) or Chief Petty Officer (de: Oberbootsmann) NATO-Rangcode OR7
in anglophone armed forces.

Wehrmacht

Heer 
In the German Wehrmacht from 1933 until 1945 there were the OR7-ranks Unterarzt (physician), Unterapotheker (pharmacologist), and Unterveterinär (veterinarian). It was also comparable to the Oberfähnrich/Oberfähnrich zur See OR7-rank.

In line to the so-called Reichsbesoldungsordnung (en: Reich's salary order), appendixes to the Salary law of the German Empire (de: Besoldungsgesetz des Deutschen Reiches) of 1927 (changes 1937 – 1940), the comparative ranks were as follows: C 15
Oberfeldwebel (Heer and Luftwaffe) 
Unterarzt (medical service of the Wehrmacht)
Feldunterarzt, from 1940
Unterveterinär (veterinarian service of the Wehrmacht)

The corps colour of the military Health Service Support (HSS) in German armed forces was traditional dark blue, and of the veterinarian service . This tradition was continued by the medical service corps in Heer and Luftwaffe of the Reichswehr and Wehrmacht.

Address 
The manner of formal addressing of military surgeons/dentists with the rank Unterarzt was, „Herr Unterarzt“.

References 

Military ranks of Germany